Gerard P. Scharfenberger (born November 29, 1958) is an American  politician, adjunct professor and Republican Party politician who has served in the New Jersey General Assembly representing the 13th Legislative District since 2020, replacing Amy Handlin. Scharfenberger had previously served on the Monmouth County Board of Chosen Freeholders and as Mayor of Middletown Township.

Background
Scharfenberger was born in Brooklyn and is a resident of Middletown Township, New Jersey. Before entering politics, Scharfenberger was an archaeologist who worked on historical sites around Monmouth County. Scharfenberger has worked as an adjunct professor of archaeology at Monmouth University.

Political career
Scharfenberger was first elected to the Middletown Township Committee in 2005. He served as Mayor in 2007, 2008, 2010, 2013, 2016 and 2017 and Deputy Mayor in 2006 and 2009. During his time as Mayor, Scharfenberger served on Chris Christie's 2009 transition team and from, 2010 to 2018, as Director of the Office for Planning Advocacy. Scharfenberger was fired from the latter position after refusing to attend a Phil Murphy press conference in support of the governor's support for a federal property tax deduction. Scharfenberger has also served on the Middletown Landmarks Commission since 1996.

Scharfenberger ran briefly for the State Assembly in 2017, but dropped out when incumbent Amy Handlin withdrew from a State Senate race against eventual winner Declan O'Scanlon. Scharfenberger was appointed to the Monmouth County Board of chosen freeholders after Serena DiMaso was elected to the State Assembly in 2018, winning the subsequent election against Democrat Larry Luttrell. Scharfenberger then ran for the State Assembly in 2019, winning alongside DiMaso.

General Assembly
Scharfenberger opposed a State Senate measure requesting that the Library of Congress remove General Phillip Kearny's statue from Statuary Hall, stating, "However well-meaning intentions may be, the eradication of symbols from our rich historic past must be prevented."

During the COVID-19 pandemic in New Jersey, Scharfenberger refused to accept his legislative salary on the grounds that his constituents' unemployment claims were not adequately fulfilled. In his letter to the state treasurer, Scharfenberger wrote, "I cannot, in good conscience, continue to accept a salary while these issues remain unresolved and my constituents struggle through no fault of their own."

Committees 
Committee assignments for the current session are:
Environment and Solid Waste
Higher Education
Regulated Professions

District 13
Each of the 40 districts in the New Jersey Legislature has one representative in the New Jersey Senate and two members in the New Jersey General Assembly. The representatives from the 13th District for the 2022—23 Legislative Session are:
Senator Declan O'Scanlon (R)
Assemblywoman Vicky Flynn (R)
Assemblyman Gerard Scharfenberger (R)

Personal life
Scharfenberger is married to wife Geraldine and has two children, Alannah and Dan. Scharfenberger's son-in-law, Tony Perry, currently serves as Mayor of Middletown and was previously Chief of Staff for state senator Joe Kyrillos.

Scharfenberger's son, Dan, is a Republican Party strategist in New Jersey.

Electoral history

New Jersey Assembly

Monmouth County Board of Chosen Freeholders

Middletown Township Committee

References

External links
Legislative webpage

Living people
County commissioners in New Jersey
Graduate Center, CUNY alumni
Hunter College alumni
Mayors of places in New Jersey
New Jersey Republicans
People from Middletown Township, New Jersey
Rutgers University alumni
21st-century American politicians
Monmouth University faculty
1958 births